Beriashvili is a Georgian surname. Notable people with the surname include:
Ilia Beriashvili (born 1998), Georgian footballer
Zarbeg Beriashvili (1939–2020), Georgian wrestler

Surnames of Georgian origin
Georgian-language surnames